Mike Eames is a British-American visual effects artist. He was nominated for an Academy Award in the category Best Visual Effects for the film Christopher Robin.

Selected filmography 
 Christopher Robin (2018; co-nominated with Chris Lawrence, Theo Jones and Chris Corbould)

References

External links 

Living people
Place of birth missing (living people)
Year of birth missing (living people)
Visual effects artists
British emigrants to the United States